Nimba United Football Club is a football club based in Sanniquellie, Nimba County, Liberia.

Winning the Liberian Premier League title in 2015, they became the first domestic champions not from the capital city since 1963.

Achievements
Liberian Premier League: 1
Liberian First Division League: 1
Liberian Cup: 0
Liberian Super Cup: 0

External links

Football clubs in Liberia
Nimba County